The Stain is a 1914 American silent drama film directed by Frank Powell and starring Edward José and Thurlow Bergen. Its cast also includes Theda Bara in her screen debut, although she is credited under her birth name Theodosia Goodman. The production was shot at Fox Studios in Fort Lee, New Jersey and on location in Lake Ronkonkoma, New York. A print of the film was discovered in Australia in the 1990s and is preserved at the George Eastman House. A short 19-second snippet is also available on YouTube.

Cast
 Edward José as Stevens (later The Judge)
 Thurlow Bergen as The young lawyer
 Virginia Pearson as Stevens' daughter
 Eleanor Woodruff as Stevens' wife
 Sam Ryan as The political boss
 Theodosia Goodman as Gang moll 
 Creighton Hale as Office clerk

See also
 List of rediscovered films

References

External links

1914 films
1914 drama films
1910s independent films
1910s rediscovered films
Silent American drama films
American silent feature films
American black-and-white films
American independent films
Films directed by Frank Powell
Films shot in New York (state)
Films shot in Fort Lee, New Jersey
Rediscovered American films
1910s American films